Luigi Tornielli di Borgolavezzaro (born 1889, date of death unknown) was an Italian bobsledder. He competed in the four-man event at the 1924 Winter Olympics. He was the president of the Italian Ice Sports Federation from 1927–1933.

References

1889 births
Year of death missing
Italian male bobsledders
Olympic bobsledders of Italy
Bobsledders at the 1924 Winter Olympics
Place of birth missing